Am 842 (or SBB-CFF-FFS Am 842) is a Swiss railway locomotive designation, assigned to:

MaK G 1204 BB
Vossloh G1000 BB

Diesel locomotives of Switzerland
Standard gauge locomotives of Switzerland